Wigan is a surname, and may refer to:

 Alfred Wigan (1814–1878), English actor-manager
 Sir Frederick Wigan, 1st Baronet (1827–1907), English merchant
 Gareth Wigan (1931–2010), British agent, producer and studio executive 
 Horace Wigan (1815–1885), English actor and dramatist
 Hugh Wigan (fl. 1386–1407), English politician 
 John Wigan (physician) (1696–1739), British physician, poet and medical author
 John Tyson Wigan (1877–1952), British army officer and politician
 Neil Wigan, British diplomat
 Willard Wigan (born 1957), English sculptor of microscopic art